Don Juan Cano de Saavedra (ca. 1502–1572) was a Spanish conquistador from Cáceres in Extremadura.

At age 18, Cano travelled to the New World and took part in Pánfilo de Narváez's expedition against Hernán Cortés. Cano subsequently fought for Cortés after Narváez's defeat.

In 1532 Cano married Isabel de Moctezuma (Tecuichpotzin), principal heir of Moctezuma II, becoming her third Spanish husband. The couple had five children: Pedro, Gonzalo, Juan, Isabel, and Catalina. Both daughters became nuns.

Cano died in Seville in September 1572.

1500s births
1572 deaths
People from the Province of Cáceres
Spanish conquistadors
Extremaduran conquistadors